Rachel Dean is an Australian clothing designer and manufacturer, known for her ethical approach to production. Her fashion company, Pony Black, is based in Tasmania, Australia.

Dean is largely self-taught in design, with her sewing experience coming through industry experience. She holds a Bachelor of Applied Science (Scientific Photography) from RMIT University and worked as an art and science teacher at Fitzroy High School between 2001 and 2009. Her sister is MasterChef Australia winner Emma Dean.

References

External links
 

Year of birth missing (living people)
Living people
People from Tasmania
Australian fashion designers
Australian women fashion designers
Australian women company founders
Australian company founders